Idrottsklubben Sleipner is a sports club in Norrköping, Sweden; the main sports are football and ten-pin bowling. It was founded in 1903, and named after the deity Odin's horse Sleipnir from Norse mythology. Currently, the club's senior men's team plays football in Division 2. They are mostly known for winning Allsvenskan in 1938, but have since been overshadowed by local rivals IFK Norrköping both locally and nationally. The rivalry in beginning 1900 up until 1950 was often fierce as IK Sleipner was the workingclass team whilst IFK Norrköping came from the academical class. The club is affiliated to the Östergötlands Fotbollförbund. In the early 20th Century, the club also played bandy. also the record holders of most goalscorers in one game against Cuba in 1938 with 7 goals.

Achievements

 Swedish Champions
 Winners (1): 1937–38

League
 Allsvenskan:
 Winners (1): 1937–38
 Runners-up (1): 1936–37
 Division 2 Östra:
 Winners (1): 1933-34
 Runners-up (1): 1943-44
 Division 3 Östra:
 Winners (1): 1952-53
 Runners-up (2): 1950-51, 1951–52
 Division 3 Nordöstra Götaland:
 Winners (4): 1961, 1967, 1978, 2021
 Division 4 Östergötland Östra:
 Winners (1): 1965

Cups
 Svenska Cupen:
 Runners-up (1): 1941
 Svenska Mästerskapet:
 Runners-up (2): 1920, 1921

Season to season

Current squad

Attendances

In recent seasons IK Sleipner have had the following average attendances:

Footnotes
A. The title of "Swedish Champions" has been awarded to the winner of four different competitions over the years. Between 1896 and 1925 the title was awarded to the winner of Svenska Mästerskapet, a stand-alone cup tournament. No club were given the title between 1926 and 1930 even though the first-tier league Allsvenskan was played. In 1931 the title was reinstated and awarded to the winner of Allsvenskan. Between 1982 and 1990 a play-off in cup format was held at the end of the league season to decide the champions. After the play-off format in 1991 and 1992 the title was decided by the winner of Mästerskapsserien, an additional league after the end of Allsvenskan. Since the 1993 season the title has once again been awarded to the winner of Allsvenskan.

References

External links

IK Sleipner 
SvenskFotboll.se – IK Sleipner

Allsvenskan clubs
Football clubs in Östergötland County
Association football clubs established in 1903
Bandy clubs established in 1903
1903 establishments in Sweden
Defunct bandy clubs in Sweden